Lake Lungern (also spelled Lungernsee or Lungerensee) is a natural lake in Obwalden, Switzerland which is named after the town Lungern on its shore. The lake is drained by the Sarner Aa river, which flows through the Sarnersee and into Lake Lucerne.

The lake was originally much larger, and covered a large part of the valley it is situated in. It is used as a reservoir.

See also
List of lakes of Switzerland

References

External links

Lakes of Obwalden
Reservoirs in Switzerland
LLungern
Lakes of the Swiss Alps